George Abner Harris (1 January 1878–1923) was an English footballer who played in the Football League for Aston Villa and West Bromwich Albion.

References

1878 births
1923 deaths
English footballers
Association football forwards
English Football League players
Halesowen Town F.C. players
Aston Villa F.C. players
West Bromwich Albion F.C. players
Telford United F.C. players
Coventry City F.C. players